The main European legal instruments covering the mutual recognition of professional qualificationsis:  Directive 2005/36/EC on the recognition of professional qualifications. The directive covers the European Economic Area and has been amended several times. The directive provides a modern EU system of recognition of professional experience and promotes automatic recognition of professional experience across the EU. The qualifications of some professions, such as doctors and architects, have been extensively harmonised by Directive 2005/36/EC. The directive offers more general guidelines for other professions, that have not been specifically regulated this Directive, or other specific rules. Any form of work that would normally be restricted in a member state to people who had gained a professional qualification in that member state are also open to nationals of the EU (and member states of the European Economic Area) who have gained a similar professional qualification in another member state.

Professions regulated in most or all EU states include:

Accountancy - British-qualified accountants (Chartered Certified Accountant (ACCA) or Chartered Accountant (ACA or CA) or International Accountant (AIA) in the UK)

Engineering - Chartered Engineer or EUR ING (European Engineer), Incorporated Engineer (UK), corporate membership of a UK professional engineering institution such as MIET - Member of the Institution of Engineering and Technology

Teaching - Teachers (qualified teacher status in the UK)

Law - Lawyers (barristers, solicitors and advocates in the UK).

Note that the regulations only apply to nationals of the 27 countries belonging to the European Economic Area - e.g. an American who gained Qualified Teacher Status in the UK would not be able, under these regulations, to teach in France, but an Irish citizen would. However, the situation would be different if the American were married to a European and they were living in a country other than the country of which the European is a national.

See also
 European Chemist
 European Engineer
 Incorporated Engineer
 Homologation
 European Qualifications Framework
The Directives referred to above have been consolidated under Directive 2005/36/EC.  This was to be transposed by Member States in October 2007.

References

Qualifications
Professional titles and certifications
Professional ethics